Lieutenant-General Michael Brennan (2 February 1896 – 24 October 1986) was the Chief of Staff of the Irish Defence Forces from October 1931 until January 1940.

Brennan was born in Meelick, County Clare, and joined the Irish Republican Brotherhood in 1911. Two years later, he helped form the Irish Volunteers in Limerick city and soon he was training men in and around Meelick. He took part in preparations for the Easter Rising and spent the next five years in and out of prison and trouble, becoming the first O/C, East Clare Brigade, and later in charge of all three Clare Brigades of the IRA. This became the First Western Division, which Éamon de Valera reputedly described as the "best in the country".

References

1896 births
1986 deaths
Irish Army generals